Tore Nordtvedt (born 24 May 1944) is a retired Norwegian football player. Nordtvedt played his entire 16-year career at SK Brann.

He debuted against Lyn Oslo in the championship season of 1963 when he was 18 years old. He played at the club from 1963 to 1979.
Nordtvedt played a total of 557 games for Brann, which is a club record.

Career statistics

Honours
Brann
1. divisjon: 1963
Norwegian Cup: 1972, 1976

References

Norwegian footballers
SK Brann players
Living people
1944 births

Association football defenders